Kentucky's 33rd House of Representatives district (the 33rd District) is in Jefferson County, Louisville, Kentucky. It encompasses:

Middletown,
Anchorage,
Blue Ridge,
Lake Forest,
Owl Creek,
Wildwood,
Douglas Hills,
Sycamore,
Woodland Hills,
Saratoga Woods,
Eastwood,
Jeffersontown,

House District 33 is a political map that has 36,856 voters 

Political Party	  Number of  Registered Voters
Democrats	  15,728
Republican	  17,979
Other	          3,149
Total	          36,856

The Kentucky Legislator for the 33rd House District is Jason Nemes, who is a member of the Republican Party. He has been serving since 2017.

References

Jefferson County, Kentucky
33